The 2019 FIBA U16 European Championship was the 33rd edition of the Under-16 European Basketball Championship. The competition took place from 9 to 17 August 2019 in Udine, Italy. The top five teams qualified for the 2020 FIBA Under-17 Basketball World Cup besides Bulgaria who automatically qualified as host.

The defending champions were Croatia.

Participating teams
  (2nd at 2018 FIBA U16 European Championship Division B)

  (3rd at 2018 FIBA U16 European Championship Division B)
  (1st at 2018 FIBA U16 European Championship Division B)

Venues

Preliminary round
The draw ceremony was held on 13 December 2018 in Belgrade, Serbia.

Group A

Group B

Group C

Group D

Final round

Main bracket

Round of 16

{{Basketballbox
|date=13 August 2019|time=18:45|place=Palazzetto Mario Vecchiato, Pasian di Prato
|report=Boxscore
|teamA= |scoreA=70
|teamB= |scoreB=44
|Q1=13–10 |Q2=18–18 |Q3=22–9 |Q4=17–7
|points1= Traore 23
|rebounds1= Dessert 11
|assist1= De Sousa 6
|points2= Kuuba 11
|rebounds2= Veesaar 9
|assist2= Reinart 5
|attendance=
|referee=
}}

Quarterfinals

Semifinals

Third place game

Final

5th–8th place classification

5th–8th place semifinals

Seventh place game

Fifth place game

9th–16th place classification

9th–16th place quarterfinals

9th–12th place semifinals

11th place game

9th place game

13th–16th place classification

13th–16th place semifinals

15th place game

13th place game

Final standings

AwardsAll-Tournament Team'''

  Juan Núñez
  Matteo Spagnolo
  Rubén Domínguez
  Adem Bona
  Victor Wembanyama
Source

References

External links
FIBA official website

FIBA U16 European Championship
2019–20 in European basketball
2019–20 in Italian basketball
International youth basketball competitions hosted by Italy
Sport in Udine
August 2019 sports events in Europe
FIBA U16